Ware is a village situated between Canterbury and Ramsgate in Kent, England. The population of the village is included in the civil parish of Ash

References

External links

Villages in Kent
Dover District